A table of contents, usually headed simply Contents and abbreviated informally as TOC, is a list, usually found on a page before the start of a written work, of its chapter or section titles or brief descriptions with their commencing page numbers.

History
Pliny the Elder credits Quintus Valerius Soranus (d. 82 B.C.) as the first author to provide a table of contents to help readers navigate a lengthy work. Pliny's own table of contents for his encyclopedic Historia naturalis ("Natural History") may be viewed online in Latin and in English (following dedication).

In the early medieval era, the innovation of table of contents had to be abandoned, due to the cost of paper. It would not be resumed until after the 12th century, where paper factories in Spain and Italy sprouted and allowed an increase in paper production throughout Europe.

Form
A table of contents usually includes the titles or descriptions of first-level headings (chapters in longer works), and often includes second-level headings (sections or A-heads) within the chapters as well, and occasionally even includes third-level headings (subsections or B-heads) within the sections as well. The depth of detail in tables of contents depends on the length of the work, with longer works having less. Formal reports (ten or more pages and being too long to put into a memo or letter) also have a table of contents. Within an English-language book, the table of contents usually appears after the title page, copyright notices, and, in technical journals, the abstract; and before any lists of tables or figures, the foreword, and the preface.

Printed tables of contents indicate page numbers where each part starts, while digital ones offer links to go to each part. The format and location of the page numbers is a matter of style for the publisher. If the page numbers appear after the heading text, they might be preceded by characters called leaders, usually dots or periods, that run from the chapter or section titles on the opposite side of the page, or the page numbers might remain closer to the titles. In some cases, the page number appears before the text.

If a book or document contains chapters, articles, or stories by different authors, their names usually appear in the table of contents.

Matter preceding the table of contents is generally not listed there. However, all pages except the outside cover are counted, and the table of contents is often numbered with a lowercase Roman numeral page number. Many popular word processors, such as Microsoft Word, WordPerfect, and StarWriter are capable of automatically generating a table of contents if the author of the text uses specific styles for chapters, sections, subsections, etc.

Examples
Example with leaders:
 Chapter 1: Getting Started . . . . . . . . . . . . . 1
    Introduction  . . . . . . . . . . . . . . . . . . 2
    Next Steps  . . . . . . . . . . . . . . . . . . . 3

Example without leaders:
 Chapter 1: Getting Started   1
    Introduction   2
    Next Steps   3

Example with authors:
 1. Introduction to Biology  Arthur C. Smith   1
 2. Microbiology  Susan Jones   10
 3. Advances in Biotechnology  T.C. Chang   24

Example with descriptive text:
 Chapter 1                                           3
    In which we first meet our hero and heroine, attend
    a gala feast, and begin an unexpected journey.
 
 Chapter 2                                          12
    The journey takes an unusual turn, and new villains
     are discovered.

See also 
 Index (publishing)

References

Citations

Sources 

 The Chicago Manual of Style (15th Edition)
 

Technical communication
Book design
Index (publishing)